1,2-Diaminopropane (propane-1,2-diamine) is organic compound with the formula CHCH(NH)CHNH. A colorless liquid, it is the simplest chiral diamine. It is used as a bidentate ligand in coordination chemistry.

Preparation
Industrially, this compound is synthesized by the ammonolysis of 1,2-dichloropropane:

CHCHClCHCl + 4 NH → CHCH(NH)CHNH + 2 NHCl

This preparation allows for the use of waste chloro-organic compounds to form useful amines using inexpensive and readily available ammonia.

The racemic mixture of this chiral compound may be separated into enantiomers by conversion into the diastereomeric tartaric acid ammonium salt. After purification of the diastereomer, the diamine can be regenerated by treatment of the ammonium salt with sodium hydroxide. Alternate reagents for chiral resolution include N-p-toluenesulfonylaspartic acid, N-benzenesulfonylaspartic acid, or N-benzoylglutamic acid.

Uses

Metal deactivator
1,2-Diaminopropane is used in the synthesis of N,N-disalicylidene-1,2-propanediamine, a salen-type ligand, usually abbreviated as salpn, that is used as a metal deactivating additive in motor oils.

References

Diamines
Chelating agents
Fuel antioxidants
Corrosion inhibitors